The fork-tailed flycatcher (Tyrannus savana) is a passerine bird of the tyrant flycatcher family, and is the member of a genus typically referred to as kingbirds. Named for their distinguishingly long, forked tail, fork-tailed flycatchers are seen in lightly forested or grassland areas, from southern Mexico, to south past Argentina. They are most frequently observed sitting on conspicuous perches waiting for flying arthropods to fly past, they then sally out, eat their prey, and return to their perches. Northern populations near southern Mexico tend to be permanent residents, while fork-tailed flycatchers that live further south are migrants with a reputation to wander as far north as the Eastern Seaboard of the United States.

Taxonomy
The fork-tailed flycatcher was described in 1760 by Mathurin Jacques Brisson under the French name "" and then again in 1780 by Georges-Louis Buffon under the name "" (because it lived in savannahs), but it was not until 1802 that François Marie Daudin coined the binomial name Tyrannus savana. The type locality is Suriname.

Four subspecies are recognised:

 T. s. monachus Hartlaub, 1844 – southern Mexico to Colombia, the Guianas, and northern Brazil
 T. s. sanctaemartae (Zimmer, JT, 1937) – northern Colombia and northwest Venezuela
 T. s. circumdatus (Zimmer, JT, 1937) – east-central Brazil
 T. s. savana Daudin, 1802 – central, southern South America and the Falkland Islands

Description
The fork-tailed flycatcher is white below and gray above, and has a black cap. Males sometimes show a yellow crown stripe. Males also have an extremely long, forked tail, of even greater length than that of the related scissor-tailed flycatcher. Females have a somewhat shorter tail, and it is significantly shorter in juveniles. They weigh only , much less than closely related kingbirds, which are half the total length of this species. The tail in adult males is two to three times longer than the length of the bird from the bill to the base of the tail. Generally, males and females of the species look quite similar, but can be distinguished by the longer tail in males.

The nominate subspecies T. s. savana has a darker grey back compared to T. s. monachus and T. s. sanctaemartae, which have notable light backs that contrast greatly with their black heads. Discrete notches on the primary feathers are also quite handy in identifying subspecies.

Most fork-tailed flycatchers are migratory, but some stay year round, especially in southern Mexico. Migratory fork-tailed flycatchers tend to have more pointed wings than nonmigratory flycatchers.

Vocalizations 

Fork-tailed flycatchers produce both vocal and nonvocal sounds. In general, they have a dry, buzzy call, and a weak "tic-note" while in flight.

Their wings have been observed to make a distinct whistling note while flying overhead. In fact, research has been conducted involving distinct differences in the pitch of whistling noises by different subspecies of T. savana. This recent research has pointed towards a hypothesis that fork-tailed flycatchers are splitting into two distinct species, as the nonmigratory birds have a much-lower-pitched whistling note than the migrators. This becomes another observed difference amongst others (e.g. wing shape) pointing to the two-species conclusion.

During mating displays, the males' wings may also make dry, crackling sounds; further research has investigated the use of these wing noises in potentially startling predators or would-be nest parasites (e.g. shiny cowbird).

Distribution and habitat 
Fork-tailed flycatchers are usually found below 1000 m elevation where they occur in a wide variety of habitats including pastures, riparian forests, forest edges, mangroves, and open residential areas with scattered trees. During migration, however, T. savana may be found in an even broader range of habitats.

Its breeding range is from central Mexico to central Argentina. In most of this range, it is usually found year-round, but in the southern parts of its range, it retreats northward for the winter.

During migration, fork-tailed flycatchers are quite gregarious, nesting in flocks of up to 10,000 individuals. This species is known to wander widely. It is spotted almost annually in the eastern United States seaboard and Canada, normally around fall (September–November).

During migration, fork-tailed flycatchers have been observed flying accompanied by relative species such as eastern kingbirds and aggressively chasing off predators.

The nominate subspecies, T. s. savana, is found in central and southern Brazil, Bolivia, Paraguay, Uruguay, and Argentina (south to the Río Negro), and overwinters in Amazonia, a large portion of northern South America (i.e., within the Orinoco River Basin), and Trinidad and Tobago, occasionally appearing in the West Indies.

Behavior

Breeding 
Males perform aerial courtship displays involving swirling somersaults, twists, and flips. All partnered with their buzzing calls, they do their best to impress female counterparts. Courtship displays also provide a usage for their long tail feathers (which are longer in males), as a way to impress potential mates. Breeding seasons are dependent on subspecies and location; breeding season ranges from late summer to mid-winter.

Fork-tailed flycatchers tend to build their cup nests in similar habitats to their hunting grounds (riparian forests, grasslands). They tend to prefer specific trees in specific geographic locations, such as Kielmeyera trees in central Brazil. The clutch is 1–3 eggs.

Diet 
This species is primarily an insectivore, but will switch to berries and small fruits during winter if insects become scarce. Fork-tailed flycatchers sally from their perches to eat flying insects or glean them off of leaves and fruit. When insects become less available in winter months, they have been observed eating fruits.

Fork-tailed flycatchers long tail is an important asset in their hunt for arthropods. The long tail allows them to turn on a dime and sally after prey.

References

External links

 
 Fork-tailed flycatcher Stamps from Argentina, Brazil, Falkland Islands, Grenada, Trinidad and Tobago, and Uruguay at bird-stamps.org
 
 Fork-tailed flycatcher Photo at John Kormendy's Birds of Brazil website
 
 
 
 
 

fork-tailed flycatcher
Birds of Central America
Birds of South America
fork-tailed flycatcher